Becky Weber (born September 24, 1954) is an American small business owner and Republican politician from the U.S. state of Wisconsin.  She served one term in the Wisconsin State Assembly (2003–2005) representing Wisconsin's 5th Assembly district.

Background 
Born in Green Bay, Weber graduated from Bay Port High School in 1972; attended Northeast Wisconsin Technical College; the University of Wisconsin-Green Bay; and the University of Oklahoma Retail Lending School. She was self-employed in restaurant development and as an insurance agent, owned a printing and office supply store, and was a bank officer.

Public office 
Weber, who had previously served on the Green Bay Plan Commission, was elected to the Wisconsin State Assembly's 5th District (northeastern Outagamie County and the Town of Maple Grove) in 2002, unseating incumbent Democrat Lee Meyerhofer with 8621 votes to Meyerhofer's 7909, and was assigned to the standing committees on aging and long-term care; budget review; government operations and spending limitations; insurance; rural affairs; and small business. She was defeated for reelection in 2004 by Democrat Tom Nelson, who received 15,014 votes to her 14,249.

Personal life 
She is Catholic; as of 2004 she was married and had two children.

References 

Businesspeople from Wisconsin
Insurance agents
Republican Party members of the Wisconsin State Assembly
Politicians from Green Bay, Wisconsin
Women state legislators in Wisconsin
1954 births
Living people
21st-century American politicians
21st-century American women politicians